Jean Galloway Bissell (June 9, 1936 – February 4, 1990) was a South Carolina attorney who became a high-ranking bank executive, and later a United States circuit judge of the United States Court of Appeals for the Federal Circuit.

Early life and education 

Born in Due West, South Carolina, Bissell earned a Bachelor of Science degree from the University of South Carolina in 1956 and a Bachelor of Laws from the University of South Carolina School of Law in 1958.

Professional career 

Bissell worked in private legal practice in Greenville, South Carolina from 1958 until 1971 and then in Columbia, South Carolina until 1976. She worked as an executive at South Carolina National Bank in Columbia from 1976 until 1984, rising to become the highest-ranking female executive among the 100 largest bank holding companies in the United States. Bissell also lectured at the University of South Carolina in the 1970s and early 1980s.

Federal judicial service 

On May 24, 1984, Bissell was nominated by President Ronald Reagan to a new seat established by 96 Stat. 25 on the United States Court of Appeals for the Federal Circuit. Reagan previously had nominated United States Department of Commerce official Sherman Unger to the seat in 1982, but Unger's nomination drew significant opposition and never was voted upon because Unger became afflicted with terminal cancer and died in late 1983. Bissell was confirmed by the United States Senate on June 8, 1984, and received her commission on June 11, 1984. With her confirmation, she became the first female South Carolina lawyer to become a federal judge. She served on the court until her death.

Death 

Bissell died of cancer on February 4, 1990, at Sibley Memorial Hospital in Washington, D.C., at the age of 53.

References

Sources 
 

1936 births
1990 deaths
Judges of the United States Court of Appeals for the Federal Circuit
United States court of appeals judges appointed by Ronald Reagan
20th-century American judges
University of South Carolina alumni
University of South Carolina School of Law alumni
20th-century American lawyers
University of South Carolina faculty
20th-century American women lawyers
20th-century American women judges